Megachile cheesmanae is a species of bee in the family Megachilidae. It was described by Charles Duncan Michener in 1965.

References

Cheesmanae
Insects described in 1965